Morpho athena  is a Neotropical butterfly.

Description
Morpho athena is a large white butterfly, very similar to Morpho luna and related species, with a brown narrow band along two-thirds of the costal edge of the forewing. This ends in a hook-shaped mark.

Distribution
This species is present in Brazil.

References

External links
"Morpho Fabricius, 1807" at Markku Savela's Lepidoptera and Some Other Life Forms
Images
External images of types

Morpho
Nymphalidae of South America
Butterflies described in 1966
Fauna of Brazil